Southern Crossing is a tramping track in New Zealand's Tararua Range.

Southern Crossing may also refer to:
Southern Crossing (California), a proposed bridge spanning California's San Francisco Bay
Southern Crossing (film), a documentary by Robert Guillemot